Triglav is a prominent peak in Slovenia.

Triglav (Slavic for 'three-headed') may also refer to:

Places 
, a section of the central Balkan Mountains in Bulgaria
2522 Triglav, an asteroid

Ships 
, a 1913 Tátra-class destroyer of the Austro-Hungarian Navy, sunk in 1915
, a 1917 Ersatz Triglav-class destroyer of the Austro-Hungarian Navy
Triglav (1939), an  torpedo boat of the Royal Yugoslav Navy, captured by Italian forces in 1941
 (2010), a Svetlyak-class patrol boat of the Slovenian Armed Forces
 (1949), a  torpedo boat of the Yugoslav Navy, obtained from Italy as war reparation 
 (1964), a  C-80-class patrol boat of the Yugoslav Navy

Other uses 
Triglav (computer), 1 1985 computer from Slovenia
Triglav (mythology), a deity in Slavic mythology
Triglav Trophy, a figure skating competition
Koser-Hrovat KB-1 Triglav, a Slovenian glider
Zavarovalnica Triglav, a Slovenian insurance company

See also
 
Troglav (disambiguation)
Triglavka, a three-pointed hat